Ghat Airport  is an airport  north of Ghat, the capital of Ghat District in Libya.

Airlines and destinations

See also
Transport in Libya
List of airports in Libya

References

External links 
 FlightStats - Ghat Airport
 OurAirports - Ghat Airport
 

Airports in Libya